Petersburg is the name of two unincorporated areas in the U.S. state of Kentucky:

Petersburg, Boone County, Kentucky, in Boone County, Kentucky
Petersburg, Louisville, in the consolidated Louisville city-county government area